The 2015–16 Western Illinois Leathernecks men's basketball team represented Western Illinois University during the 2015–16 NCAA Division I men's basketball season. The Leathernecks, led by second year head coach Billy Wright, played their home games at Western Hall and were members of The Summit League. They finished the season 10–17, 3–13 in Summit League play to finish in last place. They failed to qualify for The Summit League tournament.

Roster

Schedule

|-
!colspan=9 style="background:#663399; color:#FFD700;"| Exhibition

|-
!colspan=9 style="background:#663399; color:#FFD700;"| Regular season

References

Western Illinois Leathernecks men's basketball seasons
Western Illinois
Western
Western